Alessandro Pessot (born 1 July 1995, in Udine) is an Italian cyclist, who most recently rode for UCI ProTeam .

Major results
2017
 1st  Overall Carpathian Couriers Race
1st Stage 1
 4th Törökbálint GP - Memorial Imre Riczu
 6th Trofeo Città di San Vendemiano
 8th Ruota d'Oro
2018
 2nd GP Kranj
 9th GP Adria Mobil

References

External links

1995 births
Living people
Italian male cyclists
Sportspeople from Udine
Cyclists from Friuli Venezia Giulia